Hans Ture Lennart Lagerqvist (28 April 1940 – 22 July 2019) was a Swedish pole vaulter who won a silver medal at the 1972 European Athletics Indoor Championships. He cleared the same height of 5.40 m as the winner, Wolfgang Nordwig, but used more attempts. Lagerqvist placed fourth at the 1971 European Championships and seventh at the 1971 European Athletics Indoor Championships and 1972 Olympics. He won the national title in 1965 and 1972 and held several national records.

Lagerqvist set three masters world records: in the M35 (1975), M50 (1990) and M55 categories (1996). He won eleven world titles in 1981–2015.

References

1940 births
2019 deaths
Athletes (track and field) at the 1972 Summer Olympics
Olympic athletes of Sweden
Swedish male pole vaulters
Athletes from Gothenburg